Shimia thalassica is a Gram-negative, mesophilic, slightly halophilic aerobic and non-motile bacterium from the genus of Shimia which has been isolated from coastal seawater from Valencia in Spain.

References 

Rhodobacteraceae
Bacteria described in 2019